Afrolimnophila joana is a species of Limoniid crane fly in the family Limoniidae. it was originally placed in the genus Limnophila.

Distribution
Nigeria

References

Limoniidae